The American Journal of Kidney Diseases (AJKD) is a monthly peer-reviewed medical journal covering all aspects of nephrology. It is the official journal of the National Kidney Foundation and is published by Elsevier. The journal publishes original research, case reports, and educational articles such as narrative reviews and teaching cases. It is abstracted and indexed in PubMed/MEDLINE/Index Medicus. According to the Journal Citation Reports, the journal has a 2016 impact factor of 7.62. The journal's current editor-in-chief is Harold I. Feldman (University of Pennsylvania). Since November 2011, the journal publishes a blog, AJKD Blog, which posts interviews with authors, commentaries, and educational material approximately twice per week.

References

External links 
 
 AJKD Blog

Elsevier academic journals
Monthly journals
English-language journals
Nephrology journals
Publications established in 1981
Academic journals associated with learned and professional societies of the United States